is a passenger railway station located in the city of Saijō, Ehime Prefecture, Japan. It is operated by JR Shikoku and has the station number "Y35".

Lines
Tamanoe Station is served by the JR Shikoku Yosan Line and is located 124.5 km from the beginning of the line at Takamatsu Station. Connections with other local or limited express trains are needed to travel further east or west along the line.

Layout
The station consists of a side platform serving a single track. There is no station building, only a shelter for waiting passengers. A ramp leads up to the platform from the access road.

Adjacent stations

History
Japanese National Railways (JNR) opened Tamanoe Station on 1 February 1963 as a new station on the existing Yosan Line.  With the privatization of JNR on 1 April 1987, control of the station passed to JR Shikoku.

Surrounding area
Saijo Municipal Yoshii Elementary School
Japan National Route 196

See also
 List of railway stations in Japan

References

External links

Station timetable

Railway stations in Ehime Prefecture
Railway stations in Japan opened in 1963
Saijō, Ehime